Erynnis pacuvius, also known as Pacuvius duskywing, Dyar's duskywing or buckthorn dusky wing, is a species of skipper butterfly in the family Hesperiidae. It is found in southern British Columbia and in most of the western United States.

The wingspan is 29–33 mm. The flight period is between June and July in the north with a second generation in the south.

The larvae feed on Ceanothus species.

References

External links
Pacuvius Duskywing, Nearctica
Pacuvius Duskywing, BugGuide
Pacuvius Duskywing, Butterflies and Moths of North America

Erynnis
Butterflies of North America
Butterflies described in 1878
Taxa named by Joseph Albert Lintner